Perun is a Slavic god.

Perun may also refer to:
Perun (comics), a Marvel Comics character based on the Slavic god
Montenegrin perun, a historical currency
Peryn, a peninsula near Veliky Novgorod (Russia)
Peryn Chapel, the Church of the Nativity of the Theotokos on Peryn 
Parndorf, a town in Austria originally known as Perun